Scotland has produced many films, directors and actors.

Scottish film directors

Scotland has also been the birthplace of many film directors, some of whom have won multiple awards or enjoy a cult reputation.

May Miles Thomas is one of these multi award-winning Scottish directors, having won Best Film, Best Director, Best Writer and Best Performance at the BAFTA New Talent Awards and Best Achievement in Production at the British Independent Film Awards for her film One Life Stand. Thomas also won the prestigious Scottish Screen Outstanding Achievement Award and was recognised as a pioneer of digital cinema for this film, for which she received a NESTA Fellowship.

Bill Forsyth is a director and writer noted for his commitment to national film-making. His best-known work is Gregory's Girl, which won an award for Best Screenplay at the BAFTA Awards.

Paul McGuigan is another Scottish director who has won awards for his work. His 2006 thriller Lucky Number Slevin, which featured an all-star cast, received awards for both Best Film and Best Actor (Josh Hartnett) at the Milan International Film Festival. It has since been recognized as a cult film.

Donald Cammell has a cult following due to his work on Performance (1970), which was co-directed by English film director Nicolas Roeg and featured Mick Jagger of The Rolling Stones fame.

List of Scottish film directors
Donald Cammell
Michael Caton-Jones
Bill Forsyth
Frank Lloyd
Gillies MacKinnon
Paul McGuigan
David Mackenzie
Lynne Ramsay
May Miles Thomas
Kevin Macdonald
Bill Douglas
John McPhail

Scottish movie & TV actors

There are a significant number of actors who have been born in Scotland and went on to have international success. Among these is Academy Award, Golden Globe Award, and BAFTA Award winning actor Sean Connery, who famously portrayed James Bond in seven of the earliest Bond movies.

Scottish actor Ewan McGregor has had success in mainstream, indie and art house films. He is perhaps best known for his role as Mark Renton in Danny Boyle's 1996 film Trainspotting, for which he won a BAFTA Scotland Award for Best Actor in a Leading Role, or for portraying the young Obi-Wan Kenobi in the Star Wars prequel trilogy. In October 1997 he was ranked 36th in Empire magazine's "The Top 100 Movie Stars of All Time" list.

James McAvoy is a BAFTA Rising Star Award winning Scottish stage and screen actor. He has featured in a number of films, including 2007's BAFTA Award-winning The Last King of Scotland and Disney's highest-grossing live action film The Chronicles of Narnia: The Lion, the Witch and the Wardrobe. McAvoy was nominated for a Golden Globe for his work in 2007's Atonement. He has also made appearances in British TV series such as Shameless and Early Doors.

Actor, comedian and author Robbie Coltrane, widely known for his role as Rubeus Hagrid in the Harry Potter series of films, is another BAFTA Award-winning actor from Scotland. He was voted 6th in a poll to find the 'most famous Scot' and placed 10th in ITV's list of "TV's Greatest Stars."

David Tennant is a multi award-winning Scottish actor best known for his role in Doctor Who as the 10th incarnation of the Doctor. He has also featured in numerous other television shows, movies, theatre productions and radio dramas.

Kelly Macdonald is a Scottish Emmy Award winning and Screen Actors Guild Award-winning actress. She has starred in many notable films, including Trainspotting alongside Ewan McGregor, the Coen brothers’ No Country for Old Men and the science fiction comedy The Hitchhiker's Guide to the Galaxy.

Brian Cox, CBE is an Emmy Award-winning Scottish actor. He is perhaps best known for portraying Hannibal Lecter in the 1986 thriller Manhunter, and has since become a familiar face in film and television. He is also known for his work with the Royal Shakespeare Company, where he gained great recognition for his portrayal of King Lear.

Some of the best-known Scottish actors include:

 Billy Boyd
 Ewen Bremner
 Gerard Butler
 Robert Carlyle
 Sean Connery
 Henry Ian Cusick
 Sean Biggerstaff
 Robbie Coltrane
 Tom Conti
 James Cosmo
 Brian Cox
 Alan Cumming
 James Finlayson
 Ncuti Gatwa
 Iain Glen
 Sam Heughan
 Ashley Jensen
 Deborah Kerr
 John Laurie
 Kelly Macdonald
 James McAvoy
 Peter Mullan
 David McCallum
 Sylvester McCoy
 Ian McDiarmid
 Ewan McGregor
 David McKay
 Kevin McKidd
 Graham McTavish
 Gray O'Brien
 Dougray Scott
 Alastair Sim
 David Tennant
 David Elliot
 Peter Capaldi
 Richard Madden
 John Barrowman
 Karen Gillan
 John Hannah
 Martin Compston
 Douglas Henshall
 Mark Bonnar

Scottish Film Council

The Scottish Film Council was established in 1934 as the national body for film in Scotland. Its founding aim was to 'improve and extend the use in Scotland of films for cultural and educational purposes and to raise the Scottish standard in the public appreciation of films'. A strong focus on film in the service of education, industry and the betterment of society shaped the SFC for a considerable part of its history and it was this that led to the establishment of the Scottish Central Film Library (SCFL), one of the largest and most successful 16mm film libraries in Europe. The Council's strengths in educational film led in the 1970s to its incorporation as a division of the newly created Scottish Council for Educational Technology (SCET).

From the late 1960s, the SFC's central strategy was to take and sustain major initiatives in each of four main areas where the health of a national film culture could most readily be measured: education, exhibition, production and archiving. It made use of the British Film Institute's 'Outside London' initiative to set up Regional Film Theatres (RFT) across Scotland. Established in collaboration with local authorities, these were to become more important in the Scottish context than elsewhere in the UK. A commitment to engage with film producers led to the SFC's involvement in film training, through the setting up of the Technician Training Scheme and later the Scottish Film Training Trust, both of which were joint ventures with the Association of Cinematograph, Television and Allied Technicians and producers.

In the late 1970s, the SFC used Job Creation Scheme funding to establish the Scottish Film Archive. Though initially conceived as a short-term exercise, its value was soon recognised and on the exhaustion of the original funding a Scottish Education Department (SED) grant was forthcoming to secure the Archive as a permanent part of the SFC's work.

During the 1980s, SED funding allowed the SFC to support courses, events, the production of material for media education, Regional Film Theatre operations in Glasgow, Edinburgh, Dundee, Inverness and Kirkcaldy, film societies, community cinemas, the Edinburgh International Film Festival, the Celtic Film and Television Festival, the Scottish Film Archive, film workshops, general information services and a range of other initiatives.

Scottish Screen

In April 1997, the Scottish Film Council, Scottish Screen Locations, Scottish Broadcast and Film Training and the Scottish Film Production Fund merged to form the non-departmental government body Scottish Screen. The Scottish Film Archive was renamed the Scottish Screen Archive.

In 2007, Scottish Screen merged with the Scottish Arts Council to form Creative Scotland and the Scottish Screen Archive transferred to the National Library of Scotland. In September 2015, the name of the Scottish Screen Archive changed to the National Library of Scotland Moving Image Archive.

Scots-language films
Neds
Ratcatcher

Scottish Gaelic language films
Being Human
Foighidinn – The Crimson Snowdrop
I Know Where I'm Going!
King Arthur
Seachd: The Inaccessible Pinnacle
The Eagle

Scottish films

Scotland's success as a film industry can also be seen through its national films. Films such as 1982's BAFTA Award-winning Gregory's Girl have helped gain Scotland recognition. Despite its low budget, it has still managed to achieve success throughout the world.
1983's Local Hero, which was rated in the top 100 films of the 1980s in a Premiere magazine recap of the decade and received overwhelmingly positive reviews (it holds a 100% fresh rating on Rotten Tomatoes).

Movies filmed in Scotland

On top of the works created by Scottish directors, there have been many successful non-Scottish films shot in Scotland. Mel Gibson’s Academy Award-winning Braveheart is perhaps the best-known and most commercially successful of these, having grossed $350,000,000 worldwide. The film won 5 Academy Awards, including ‘Best Picture’ and ‘Best Director’ and was nominated for additional awards. The film's depiction of the Battle of Stirling Bridge, which the plot of the film surrounds, is often regarded as one of the greatest movie battles in cinema history.

Other notable films to have been shot at least partly in Scotland include Dog Soldiers, Highlander and Trainspotting and Stardust.

List of movies filmed in Scotland

2001: A Space Odyssey
633 Squadron
 
A

A Man Called Peter
A Shot at Glory
Aazoo
Aberdeen
The Acid House
The Adventures of Greyfriars Bobby
Ae Fond Kiss
AfterLife
American Cousins
The Amorous Prawn
The Angels' Share
Another Time, Another Place
Around the World in 80 Days
Astérix et Obélix contre César
Attack of the Herbals
Avengers: Infinity War
Avengers: Endgame'BThe Battle of the Sexes
Beautiful Creatures
Being Human
The Big Tease
Blinded
Blind Flight
Blue Black Permanent
Bobby Jones: Stroke of Genius
Bonnie Prince Charlie
Breaking the Waves
Braveheart
The Bridal Path
The Brothers
The BruceCCarla's Song
Carry On Regardless
Casino Royale
Centurion
Chariots of Fire
Charlotte Gray
Chasing the Deer
Cloud Atlas (2013)
Comfort and Joy
Complicity
Country Dance
CullodenDThe Da Vinci Code
Dear Frankie
Death Watch
The Debt Collector
The Descent
Dog Soldiers
Dragonslayer
Double X: The Name of the Game
The DuellistsEThe Eagle
The Edge of the World
Enigma
Entrapment
The Evil Beneath Loch Ness
Eye of the NeedleFFestival
Flash Gordon
The Flying Scotsman
The Flying Scotsman
From the Island
From Russia with LoveGGeordie
The Governess
Gregory's Girl
Gregory's Two Girls
Greyfriars Bobby
GreystokeHHamlet
Harry Potter and the Philosopher's Stone
Harry Potter and the Chamber of Secrets
Harry Potter and the Prisoner of Azkaban
Harry Potter and the Goblet of Fire
Heartless
Heavenly Pursuits
Highlander
Highlander III: The Sorcerer
Highlander: Endgame
Hold back the Night
The House of Mirth
Hunted
 IIll fares the Land
I Know Where I'm Going!
In a Man's World
In Search of La Che
Incident at Loch Ness
 JThe Jacket
Journey to the Center of the Earth
Jude
 KKidnapped (1960)
Kidnapped (1971)
The Kidnappers
Kuch Kuch Hota Hai
 LThe Land that Time Forgot
The Last Great Wilderness
The Last King of Scotland
Late Night Shopping
Laxdale Hall
Les Liaisons Dangereuses
The Little Vampire
Local Hero
Loch Ness
 MMacbeth
Madame Sin
The Magdalene Sisters
The Maggie
Man Dancin'
Man to Man
Mary, Queen of Scots (1971 film)
Mary Queen of Scots (2018 film)
Mary Reilly
The Master of Ballantrae
The Match
Max Manus: Man of War
The Missionary
Mission Impossible
Monty Python and the Holy Grail
Monty Python's The Meaning of Life
Morvern Callar
Mr. Magorium's Wonder Emporium
Mrs Brown
My Ain Folk
My Childhood
My Life so Far
My Name is Joe
My Way HomeOOn a Clear Day
One Last Chance
One More Kiss
Orphans
 PPostmortem
The Prime of Miss Jean Brodie
The Private Life of Sherlock Holmes
The Purifiers
Pyaar Ishq Aur MohabbatQThe Queen
Quest for FireRRatcatcher
Regeneration
Restless Natives
Riff-Raff
Ring of Bright Water
The Rocket Post
Rockets Galore
Rob Roy
Rob Roy, the Highland RogueSSafe Haven
Salt on Our Skin
Shallow Grave
Shepherd on the Rock
The Silver Fleet
Sixteen Years of Alcohol
Skagerrak
Skyfall
Small Faces
Soft Top Hard Shoulder
Solid Air
The Spy in Black
The Spy Who Loved Me
Staggered
Strictly Sinatra
Supergirl
Sweet SixteenTThat Sinking Feeling
The 39 Steps (1935)
The Thirty Nine Steps (1959)
The Thirty Nine Steps (1978)
The Inheritance
This Is Not a Love Song
To Catch a Spy
To End All Wars
Trainspotting
Trouble in the Glen
Tunes of GloryUUnder the Skin
UnleashedVValhalla Rising
Venus PeterWWhat a Whopper
When Eight Bells Toll
Where Do We Go from Here? (2015)
Whisky Galore
The Wicker Man
Wilbur Wants to Kill Himself
The Winter Guest
De Wisselwachter
Winter Solstice
Women Talking Dirty
The World Is Not Enough
World War Z (2013)
 Y'''Year of the CometYoung AdamYou InsteadFurther reading
 Brown, John, Developing a Scottish Film Culture II, in Parker, Geoff (ed.), Cencrastus No. 20, Spring 1985, pp. 13 & 14, 
 Bruce, David, Developing a Scottish Film Culture, in Parker, Geoff (ed.), Cencrastus No. 19, Winter 1984, p. 42, 
 Bruce, David (1997), Scotland the Movie, Polygon, Edinburgh, 
 Fielder, Miles (2003), The 50 best Scottish Films of all time, The List, Edinburgh
 Caughie, John; Griffiths, Trevor; and Velez-Serna, Maria A. (eds.) (2018), Early Cinema in Scotland, Edinburgh University Press, 
 Hardy, Forsyth (1991), Scotland in Film, Edinburgh University Press, 
 McArthur, Colin (ed.) (1982), Scotch Reels: Scotland in Cinema and Television, BFI Publishing, 
 McArthur, Colin (1983), Scotland: The Reel Image, 'Scotch Reels' and After, in Hearn, Sheila G. (ed.), Cencrastus No. 11, New Year 1983, pp. 2 & 3, 
 McArthur, Colin (1983), The Maggie, in Hearn, Sheila G. (ed.), Cencrastus No. 12, Spring 1983, pp. 10 - 14, 
 McArthur, Colin (2001), Brigadoon, Braveheart and the Scots: Distortions of Scotland in Hollywood Cinema, Bloomsbury - I.B. Tauris,  
 Skirrow, Gillian (ed.), Bain, Douglas and Ouainé (1982), Woman, Women and Scotland: 'Scotch Reels' and Political Perspectives, in Hearn, Sheila G. (ed.), Cencrastus'' No. 11, New Year 1983, pp. 3 - 6,

See also

 List of Scotland–based production companies
 List of cinema of the world
 Cinema of Europe
 Cinema of the United Kingdom
 Cinema of Wales

References

External links

 Scottishscreen.com
 New Scottish Cinema